Andrew Boulton Firestone (born July 10, 1975) is an American television personality and businessman. He is the son of Brooks Firestone, a grandson of Leonard Firestone, and a great-grandson of Firestone Tire and Rubber Company founder Harvey Firestone and Idabelle Smith.

Early life
Educated at Stevenson School and Westminster School, he graduated from the University of San Diego in business administration where he also was a member of the football team, in 1998.

Career

Professional career 
Andrew Firestone is Principal and Founder of StonePark Capital, a Santa Barbara-based hospitality firm that focuses on the acquisition and development of select-service hotels, and applies a disciplined set of strategies that prioritizes investor return. Currently StonePark capital has projects in Santa Barbara, Morgan Hill, Santa Rosa, and San Luis Obispo, California.

The Bachelor
Firestone was the third bachelor on the ABC reality series The Bachelor. On the show, premiered in March 2003,  Firestone courted 25 bachelorettes, progressively eliminating them, and eventually selected one of the group for a continuing relationship. Andrew selected and proposed to Jen Schefft, who accepted and moved to California to be with him. The couple decided to go their separate ways in December 2003 but remained friends.

Other television appearances
In 2005, Firestone participated in the fifth Celebrity Poker Showdown tournament on Bravo. He won his first-round game but placed third in the tournament championship. Firestone played for the charity Direct Relief.

In 2006, Firestone appeared in an episode of VH1's Celebrity Paranormal Project.

Firestone is the host of a lifestyle series entitled Billionaires Car Club, distributed by American Television Distribution. It first aired in May 2008.

Firestone also made an appearance on episode two of Flavor of Love Girls: Charm School on VH1.

Firestone and his wife have appeared in television advertisements for the Baby Bullet.

Personal life
On July 5, 2008, Firestone married actress/model Ivana Bozilovic at St. Mark's in the Valley Episcopal Church in Los Olivos, California. Firestone and Bozilovic have three children: sons Adam Brooks (born March 21, 2009) and Shane (born January 27, 2014), and daughter Anja Jasmine (born April 15, 2011).

References

External links
Billionaires Car Club Official Website

1975 births
Living people
Businesspeople from California
Episcopalians from California
American people of Austrian descent
Firestone family
Television personalities from California
People from Santa Barbara, California
University of San Diego alumni
Bachelor Nation contestants